Mount Wade is a massive mountain in Antarctica. It is the most distinctive landmark in its region and the highest in its range, standing six kilometres northwest of Mount Campbell in the Prince Olav Mountains. The mountain is easily viewed from Shackleton Glacier or the Ross Ice Shelf.

Discovery and etymology
The mountain was discovered by Roald Amundsen in 1911. It was photographed by Byrd on flights to the Queen Maud Mountains in November 1929. It was named by US-SCAN for F. Alton Wade (1903–78), a geologist with the Byrd Antarctic Expedition (1933–35). He was also senior scientist at West Base of the United States Antarctic Program (1939–41), and leader of two Texas Tech Shackleton Glacier Parties (1962–63 and 1964–65) to this vicinity; Senior Scientist USARP Marie Byrd Land Survey, 1966–67 and 1967–68.

References

Mountains of the Ross Dependency
Queen Maud Mountains
Dufek Coast
Four-thousanders of Antarctica